Gon' Boogaloo is the fifth album by Australian blues musician C. W. Stoneking. It was released in October 2014 and peaked at number 17 on the ARIA Charts.

AT the ARIA Music Awards of 2015, the album won ARIA Award for Best Blues and Roots Album.

At the AIR Awards of 2015, the album won Best Independent Blues and Roots Album.

Track listing
 "How Long" – 3:14
 "The Zombie" – 3:53
 "Get On the Floor" – 3:47
 "The Thing I Done" – 3:20
 "Tomorrow Gon' Be Too Late" – 3:06
 "Mama Got the Blues" – 3:24
 "Goin' Back South" – 3:31
 "The Jungle Swing" – 3:16
 "Good Luck Charm" – 2:45
 "I'm the Jungle Man" – 3:00
 "On a Desert Isle" – 4:42
 "We Gon' Boogaloo" – 3:27

Charts

References

2014 albums
C. W. Stoneking albums
ARIA Award-winning albums